Laura Farnsworth Dogu (born 1964) is an author and diplomat who is the United States Ambassador to Honduras. She previously served as the United States Ambassador to Nicaragua in the Obama administration.

Early life and education
Dogu is a resident of Texas. Her father was a career Naval officer. Dogu earned a B.A., B.B.A. (1985) and M.B.A. (1989) from Southern Methodist University in Dallas. She later earned an M.S. from the Dwight D. Eisenhower School for National Security and Resource Strategy in 2007.

Career
Dogu began her career as a marketing representative for IBM, where she worked for five years. After joining the Foreign Service, she became a consular officer at the embassy in San Salvador in 1991. She then served as a consular and political officer at the American Embassy in Turkey. Returning to Washington, D.C. in 1996, she was assigned to the State Department operations center. A year later she became a staff assistant in the Bureau of Consular Affairs. International assignments followed in Egypt, Turkey and Mexico. When she was nominated by President Obama to become U.S. Ambassador to Nicaragua, she was serving as Deputy Chief of Mission at the U.S. Embassy in Mexico City.

Dogu is also an author. Along with Taylor Larimore, Mel Lindauer, and Richard Ferri, Dogu is a co-author of The Bogleheads' Guide to Retirement Planning. She is one of the leaders of the online Bogleheads (www.bogleheads.org).

Ambassador to Nicaragua
On May 13, 2015, President Barack Obama nominated Dogu to be the next ambassador to Nicaragua. Hearings were held before the Senate Foreign Relations Committee on her nomination on July 15, 2015. On July 29, 2015, the committee favorably reported the nomination to the Senate floor. Dogu was confirmed by the entire Senate via voice vote on August 5, 2015.

Ambassador to Honduras
On November 5, 2021, President Joe Biden nominated Dogu to be the next ambassador to Honduras. Hearings were held before the Foreign Relations Committee on February 8, 2022. The committee favorably reported her nomination to the Senate floor on March 8, 2022. The entire Senate confirmed Dogu via voice vote on March 10, 2022. She arrived in Honduras on April 6, 2022, and presented her credentials to President of Honduras Xiomara Castro de Zelaya on April 12.

Personal life
Dogu and her husband, Aydin, have two children. In addition to English, she speaks Spanish, Turkish, and Arabic.

References

|-

1964 births
Living people
Ambassadors of the United States to Honduras
Ambassadors of the United States to Nicaragua
American women ambassadors
Southern Methodist University alumni
Dwight D. Eisenhower School for National Security and Resource Strategy alumni
21st-century American women
American women diplomats